The 2018 Connecticut Open (also known as the 2018 Connecticut Open presented by United Technologies for sponsorship reasons) was a tennis tournament played on outdoor hard courts. It was the 50th edition of the Connecticut Open, and part of the Premier Series of the 2018 WTA Tour. It took place at the Cullman-Heyman Tennis Center in New Haven, Connecticut, United States, from August 19 through August 25. It was the last event of the 2018 US Open Series before the 2018 US Open.

Points

Point distribution

Prize money

1Qualifiers prize money is also the Round of 32 prize money.
*per team

Singles main-draw entrants

Seeds

 Rankings are as of August 13, 2018

Other entrants
The following players received wildcards into the singles main draw:
  Danielle Collins
  Simona Halep
  Karolína Plíšková
  CoCo Vandeweghe

The following players received entry using protected rankings:
  Timea Bacsinszky
  Laura Siegemund

The following players received entry from the qualifying draw:
  Ana Bogdan
  Zarina Diyas
  Camila Giorgi
  Monica Puig
  Aliaksandra Sasnovich
  Dayana Yastremska

The following players received entry as lucky losers:
  Belinda Bencic
  Pauline Parmentier
  Samantha Stosur

Withdrawals
Before the tournament
  Ashleigh Barty → replaced by  Samantha Stosur
  Kiki Bertens → replaced by  Pauline Parmentier
  Mihaela Buzărnescu → replaced by  Irina-Camelia Begu
  Simona Halep → replaced by  Belinda Bencic
  Daria Kasatkina → replaced by  Maria Sakkari

During the tournament
  Johanna Konta

Retirements
  Petra Kvitová
  Monica Puig
  CoCo Vandeweghe

Doubles main-draw entrants

Seeds

Rankings are as of 13 August 2018

Other entrants
The following pair received a wildcard into the doubles main draw:
  Desirae Krawczyk /  Sachia Vickery
  Karolína Plíšková /  Kristýna Plíšková

The following pairs received entry as alternates:
  Monique Adamczak /  Oksana Kalashnikova
  Kirsten Flipkens /  Alison Van Uytvanck

Withdrawals
Before the tournament
  Johanna Konta
  CoCo Vandeweghe

Retirements
  Demi Schuurs

Finals

Singles

  Aryna Sabalenka defeated  Carla Suárez Navarro, 6–1, 6–4

Doubles

  Andrea Sestini Hlaváčková /  Barbora Strýcová defeated  Hsieh Su-wei /  Laura Siegemund, 6–4, 6–7(7–9), [10–4]

Notes

References

External links

 
Connecticut Open by year
2018 WTA Tour
2018 US Open Series
August 2018 sports events in the United States